Emil Leroy Mayer (September 7, 1902 – January 12, 1962) was an American football player. He played college football for Bethany (WV) and Catholic University and in the National Football League (NFL) as an end for the Pottsville Maroons in 1927 and the Portsmouth Spartans in 1930. He appeared in 11 NFL games, three as a starter.

References

1902 births
1962 deaths
Pottsville Maroons players
Portsmouth Spartans players
Players of American football from Ohio